Epia domina is a moth in the family Bombycidae first described by Pieter Cramer in 1780. It is found in Suriname.

References

Bombycidae